Pierre Carmouche (9 April 1797 - 9 December 1868) was a French playwright and chansonnier. He wrote more than 200 successful plays, comedies, comédies en vaudevilles and texts for opéras comiques, in collaboration with diverse authors - Brazier, Dumersan, Mélesville, de Courcy, etc.

In 1824 he married the actress Jenny Vertpré.

He also collected a rich library, bequeathed in part to marshal Canrobert.

Theatre 
 Les Poissons d'avril, ou le Charivari, comédie en vaudevilles, with Émile Cottenet, Théâtre de la Porte-Saint-Martin, 1 April 1816.
 Le Bateau à vapeur, comedy in one act, mingled with couplets, with Émile Cottenet, Philibert Rozet, Théâtre de la Porte Saint-Martin, 1816.
 L'Heureuse Moisson, ou le Spéculateur en défaut, comédie en vaudevilles in 1 act mingled with couplets, with Jean-Toussaint Merle and Frédéric de Courcy, Théâtre de la Porte-Saint-Martin, September 1817.
 La Cloyère d'huitres, ou les Deux Briquebec, comédie en vaudevilles in 1 act, with Frédéric de Courcy and Jean-Toussaint Merle, Théâtre de la Porte-Saint-Martin, 25 January 1820
 La Petite Corisandre, comédie en vaudevilles in 1 act, with Henri Dupin and Frédéric de Courcy, Théâtre de la Porte-Saint-Martin, 11 October 1820.
 Chacun son numéro, ou le Petit Homme gris, comédie en vaudevilles in 1 act, with Théodore Baudouin d'Aubigny and Boirie, Théâtre de la Porte-Saint-Martin, 6 December 1821.
 Le Coq de village, tableau vaudeville by Charles-Simon Favart with changes from Carmouche and Frédéric de Courcy, Théâtre de la Porte-Saint-Martin, 16 July 1822.
 La Réconciliation, ou la Veille de la Saint-Louis, tableau-vaudeville in 1 act, with Frédéric de Courcy and Ferdinand Laloue, Théâtre de la Porte-Saint-Martin, 23 August 1822.
 Le Grenadier de Fanchon, comédie en vaudevilles in 1 act, with Emmanuel Théaulon and Nicolas Brazier, Théâtre des Variétés, 13 December 1824.
 In vino veritas, comédie en vaudevilles in 1 act, with Saint-Ange Martin and Frédéric de Courcy, Théâtre de la Porte-Saint-Martin, 24 April 1825.
 Les Filets de Vulcain ou le Lendemain d'un succès, foly-vaudeville en 1 act, with Armand-François Jouslin de La Salle and Dupin, Théâtre de la Porte-Saint-Martin, 15 July 1826.
 Cinq heures du soir, ou le Duel manqué, comédie en vaudevilles in 1 act, with Emmanuel Théaulon and Mélesville, Théâtre des Variétés, 4 September 1827.
 Le Mariage impossible, comédie en vaudevilles in 2 acts, with Mélesville, Théâtre des Variétés, 1828.
 Le puff. Comédie en vaudevilles in 3 tableaux, with Varin and Louis Huart, 1838.
 Deux-Ânes, comédie en vaudevilles in 1 act, with Mélesville, Théâtre du Palais Royal, 1842.

Sources 
 Louis Gustave Vapereau, Dictionnaire universel des littératures, Paris, Hachette, 1876, p. 381

External links 
 

19th-century French dramatists and playwrights
19th-century French male writers
French opera librettists
French chansonniers
Writers from Lyon
1797 births
1868 deaths
French male dramatists and playwrights